Svarstad is a village in Larvik, Norway. Svarstad Church was built in 1657 and is located here.

Svarstad ski center ran 8 ski slopes for both children and adults until the start of winter 2015, when it closed due to bankruptcy. Holemyra is a fairly sizable forested area located in the midst of Svarstad, and this is also a popular picnic and hiking area with residents.

References

Villages in Vestfold og Telemark
Populated places on the Numedalslågen
Larvik